Dyspessa maroccana is a species of moth of the family Cossidae. It is found in Morocco.

References

Moths described in 1917
Dyspessa
Moths of Africa